Eric Redhead is a Canadian politician, who was elected to the Legislative Assembly of Manitoba in a by-election in 2022. Before entering provincial politics, Redhead served two terms as chief of the Shamattawa First Nation, and briefly served as acting Grand Chief of the Assembly of Manitoba Chiefs. He represents the electoral district of Thompson as a member of the New Democratic Party of Manitoba.

Electoral history

References

New Democratic Party of Manitoba MLAs
Living people
First Nations politicians
People from Thompson, Manitoba
21st-century Canadian politicians
Year of birth missing (living people)